East Pond is a small lake northeast of Big Moose in Herkimer County, New York. It drains northwest via South Branch which flows into Stillwater Reservoir.

See also
 List of lakes in New York

References 

Lakes of New York (state)
Lakes of Herkimer County, New York